Bristol North was a borough constituency which returned one Member of Parliament (MP) to the House of Commons of the UK Parliament from 1885 until it was abolished for the 1950 general election.

History
The seat was one of a small minority spanning the period which never elected a Conservative and Unionist Party candidate. In its early history Bristol North three times elected a Liberal Unionist who was affiliated with the Conservative Party; the latter having declined to field a candidate in those elections and in three others of the eight before World War I.  In the eight elections from and including 1918 the Labour Party fielded candidates and won three times; a Unionist stood once without success; candidates considered Lloyd-George Coalition Liberal, National Liberal and Liberal National (reflecting complex splinter groups of the Liberal Party during the period) stood once apiece and an Independent Liberal who was the MP as a mainstream Liberal since the previous election in 1924 ran against the official party's new candidate in 1929, unsuccessfully.  In two of these four instances the splinter arguably centrist Liberal candidate won.  The Liberal incumbent Bernays also defected from the main body of his party in 1936 to join the National Liberal (1931) Party despite being re-elected as a candidate of the more established party in 1935.

Boundaries
1885–1918: The Municipal Borough of Bristol wards of District, St James's, and St Paul's, and part of North ward, and the local government district of Stapleton.

1918–1950:  The County Borough of Bristol wards of District, St Philip and Jacob North, and Stapleton, and part of Easton ward.

Members of Parliament 

Note: * denotes re-elected.

Elections

Elections in the 1880s

Elections in the 1890s

Elections in the 1900s

Elections in the 1910s 

General Election 1914–15:

Another General Election was required to take place before the end of 1915. The political parties had been making preparations for an election to take place and by the July 1914, the following candidates had been selected; 
Liberal: Rt Hon. Augustine Birrell
Unionist: Laurie Magnus

Elections in the 1920s

Elections in the 1930s

Elections in the 1940s

References 

Parliamentary constituencies in South West England (historic)
Constituencies of the Parliament of the United Kingdom established in 1885
Constituencies of the Parliament of the United Kingdom established in 1950
Parliamentary constituencies in Bristol